Pharmacare is a Canadian proposal for a publicly-funded insurance program for medications, similar to Medicare for health insurance. Limited pharmacare programs exist in the provinces of Ontario, Manitoba, and British Columbia. Multiple organizers and commenters have advocated a pan-Canadian pharmacare program to complement the existing health system, but the precise model for implementation is unclear.

In 2019, Prime Minister Justin Trudeau promised to implement pharmacare if re-elected. , this pledge is unfulfilled.

References

External links
 A Prescription for Canada: Achieving Pharmacare for All - Final Report of the Advisory Council on the Implementation of National Pharmacare. Canada.ca. 
 Pharmacare 2020

Health law in Canada
Publicly funded health care
Canadian political phrases